Trestoncideres santossilvai is a species of beetle in the family Cerambycidae. It was described by Nearns and Tavakilian in 2012.

References 

Onciderini
Beetles described in 2012